Heterocaprella krishnaensis is a species of crustacean from the Caprellidae family. The scientific name of this species was first published in 1983 by Swarupa & Radhakrishna.

References

Corophiidea
Crustaceans described in 1983